Jan-Erik James Knudsen (born 1957) is a Norwegian crime author. He made his debut in 2008 with the book En fiende å frykte. His second book, Memo fra en morder, will be released by Aschehoug in autumn 2010. Jan Knudsen grew up in Asker, is a trained teacher, and currently works at Ullevål University Hospital.

References

External links 
 Official website

21st-century Norwegian novelists
Norwegian crime fiction writers
People from Asker
1957 births
Living people